TT Line may refer to:

 TT-Line, a German shipping company operating between Germany and Sweden
 TT-Line Company, an Australian shipping company operating the Spirit of Tasmania service between Tasmania and Victoria